Horst Heese (born 31 December 1943) is a German former professional football player and manager.
Heese had 149 Bundesliga appearances for Eintracht Frankfurt and HSV. After his retirement he managed Offenbach, Nürnberg and Frankfurt. After being sacked in 1993 in Frankfurt he moved back to Eupen in Belgium, where he still lives.

In 1988, he became the national coach of Malta until May 1991. After that, he coached in Cyprus and Singapore before returning to Malta for another four years as technical director and then as head coach.

References

External links
 Horst Heese at eintracht-archiv.de 
 

1943 births
Living people
Footballers from Düsseldorf
Eintracht Frankfurt managers
Eintracht Frankfurt players
German footballers
German football managers
Hamburger SV players
Bundesliga players
Wuppertaler SV players
Bundesliga managers
2. Bundesliga managers
FSV Frankfurt managers
Viktoria Aschaffenburg managers
Kickers Offenbach managers
1. FC Nürnberg managers
SC Fortuna Köln managers
Expatriate football managers in Malta
Malta national football team managers
Association football forwards
Freiburger FC managers
20th-century German people